Kearran Giovanni is an American actress, best known for her role as Detective Amy Sykes in the TNT police procedural series Major Crimes.

Life and career
Giovanni was born in Lafayette, Louisiana and raised in Katy, Texas. She attended The High School for the Performing and Visual Arts in Austin, Texas and later the University of Cincinnati – College-Conservatory of Music. In 2004, she moved to New York and began her career on Broadway. She appeared in a number of productions, including Hugh Jackman: Back on Broadway, Catch Me If You Can, Guys and Dolls, Sweet Charity, and Tarzan.

Giovanni played Dr. Vivian Wright, a recurring role on the ABC daytime soap opera One Life to Live from 2009 to the series finale in 2012. In February 2012, Giovanni won her first series regular role as Detective Amy Sykes in the TNT police procedural series Major Crimes. She also guest-starred on USA Network's Royal Pains in 2012, and on The CW's Beauty and the Beast in 2013.

In 2016, Giovanni had a recurring as Senator Diane Hunter in the ABC political drama series Designated Survivor. Following the conclusion of Major Crimes in 2018, Giovanni guest-starred on The CW series Dynasty and the CBS series Bull, before recurring on the second season of the CW's Black Lightning as Cutter.

Filmography

References

External links
 
 

Actresses from Texas
American soap opera actresses
American television actresses
American stage actresses
21st-century American actresses
Living people
University of Cincinnati – College-Conservatory of Music alumni
1981 births
People from Katy, Texas
People from Lafayette, Louisiana
Actresses from Louisiana